Notomicrus is a genus of beetles in the family Noteridae, containing the following species:

 Notomicrus brevicornis Sharp, 1882
 Notomicrus chailliei Manuel, 2015
 Notomicrus femineus Manuel, 2015
 Notomicrus gracilipes Sharp, 1882
 Notomicrus huttoni Young, 1978
 Notomicrus josiahi Miller, 2013
 Notomicrus malkini Young, 1978
 Notomicrus nanulus (LeConte, 1863)
 Notomicrus reticulatus Zimmermann, 1921
 Notomicrus sabrouxi Manuel, 2015
 Notomicrus sharpi J.Balfour-Browne, 1939
 Notomicrus tenellus (Clark, 1863)
 Notomicrus traili Sharp, 1882

References

Noteridae